Luminous Interactive is a digital art platform created by Lendlease in collaboration with Ramus Illumination. It was officially opened in the Darling Quarter Precinct in Sydney central business district (CBD) on 18 May 2012. 

Luminous at Darling Quarter is a permanent platform solely for illuminated digital 'art' – both animated and static. The 'canvas' extends over four levels of two campus-style buildings, covering 557 windows in total, and presents a digital façade spanning a distance of 150 metres. The artistic and design direction was set by international light artist Bruce Ramus, with Ramus studio responsible for design management and production of the work. Fixtures were manufactured by Australian architectural lighting specialists Klik Systems using advanced LED systems.

Interactive

Interactive content is available from 6pm, Friday through Sunday, with touch screen kiosks in Tumbalong Park allowing the general public to paint their own digital designs and play over-scaled arcade games on the buildings in front of them. People may also play using their smart phone or contribute on their computer through a dedicated website. The online component of Luminous is similar to Project Blinkenlights, a Berlin digital light installation, and altered to allow use by the public.

Luminous concept

The Commonwealth Bank occupying the buildings is joint partner in the project along with the Sydney Harbour Foreshore Authority and Lendlease. The consortium selected Bruce Ramus as the first artist, Artistic Director and Lighting Designer for Luminous.

Technology

At Darling Quarter, each window forms a 'pixel' in the canvas and forms an animated picture when viewed from far away. The system uses RGBW LEDs for colour. It also integrates music using graphic synchronisation to visualise sound-based designs.

Darling Quarter uses automated timber louvres to reflect light (running along the windowsills, angled upwards with a 10-degree spreader lens). It is powered using solar panels.

Darling Quarter

Lendlease designed and constructed Darling Quarter for owner APPF Commercial and first proposed the idea of a permanent space for illuminated art. Darling Quarter precinct includes a community green, children’s playground, and a large number of world-food restaurants, cafes and bars, and reflects Lend Lease’s enthusiasm for iconic new spaces for future generations.

The digital façade is active six evenings a week. On Tuesdays, Wednesdays and Thursdays, displaying ‘soft’ images (such as clouds or waves). On Friday, Saturday and Sunday 'Luminous' displays interactive artworks that aim to invite debate and make art critics – and artists - of every citizen and visitor. 

Sydney has a growing reputation for light shows, particularly due to the annual Vivid Sydney festival and the SPARC DESIGN lighting conferences at the Museum of Modern Art, which are regularly sponsored by Klik Systems and other long-term supporters in the Australian lighting industry. Vivid Sydney was inaugurated in 2008, curated in 2010 by Laurie Anderson and Lou Reed and is billed as an international carbon-neutral festival of Light, Music and Ideas. The 2012 musical line-up includes Sufjan Stevens and Florence & The Machine.

References

External links
Designboom
Artdaily
WSJ Life & Style
Treehugger Living/Culture
Guardian on Vivid Sydney
Go Australia
Klik Systems
Ramus Illumination
iion Ltd
Lend Lease
Darling Quarter Official Website

Arts in Australia
Digital technology
Architectural lighting design
Buildings and structures in Sydney